Enn Meri (born 15 January 1942) is an Estonian politician. He was a member of XIII Riigikogu.

References

Living people
1942 births
Estonian Free Party politicians
Members of the Riigikogu, 2015–2019
Recipients of the Order of the White Star, 5th Class
People from Kuressaare